Mazda Motor Corporation has many production and administrative facilities worldwide.

Offices
 Main office – Aki, Hiroshima, Japan – Established in 1920
 Tokyo office – Chiyoda, Tokyo, Japan
 Osaka office – Kita, Osaka, Japan
 Mazda North American Operations – Irvine, California, USA – Established February 1971
 Mazda Canada – Richmond Hill, Ontario, Canada – Established January 1968
 Mazda Mexico – Santa Fe, Mexico – Established December 2004
 Mazda de Colombia – Bogotá, Colombia – Established May 2014
 Mazda Motor Europe – Leverkusen, Germany
 Mazda Motor Logistics Europe – Willebroek, Belgium
 Mazda Motors UK – Dartford, Kent, UK
 Mazda Automobiles France – St Germain en Laye, France
 Mazda Motors (Deutschland) GmbH - Leverkusen, Germany
 Mazda Suisse – Lancy, Switzerland
 Mazda Austria – Klagenfurt, Austria
 Mazda Automóviles España – Madrid, Spain
 Mazda Motor de Portugal – Lisbon, Portugal
 Mazda Motor Italia – Rome, Italy
 Mazda Motor Beijing – Chaoyang, China
 China FAW Group Corporation:
 FAW HAIMA Automobile – Haikou, China
 FAW Car Company – Changchun, China
 Mazda Motor Shanghai – Shanghai, China
 Mazda Motor Taiwan Co., Ltd. – Taipei, Taiwan, Republic of China
 Mazda Australia – Mulgrave, Victoria, Australia
 Mazda Motors of New Zealand – Auckland, New Zealand
 Vinamazda – Ho Chi Minh City, Vietnam
 Mazda Myanmar – Yangon, Myanmar

R&D
 Hiroshima R&D – Aki, Hiroshima, Japan
 Mazda R&D Center Yokohama – Kanagawa-ku, Yokohama, Kanagawa,  Japan – Established June 1987
 Mazda Proving Grounds – listing of current known Mazda Proving facilities

List of Mazda production plants

The following table summarises a list of Mazda production plants. The list includes manufacturing and assembly plants wholly owned or wholly operated by Mazda, in addition to joint-venture plants in which Mazda held equity stakes.

The list excludes multi-manufacturer contract assembly plants in which Mazda held no equity stake.

Other assembly locations

Active
 Astra Daihatsu Motor – Sunter, Jakarta, Indonesia
 Daihatsu Motor Co., Ltd. – Ōyamazaki, Kyoto, Japan
 FAW Group – Changchun, Jilin, China 
 Isuzu Motors Ltd. – Fujisawa, Japan
 Isuzu Motors (Thailand) – Samut Prakan, Thailand
 Kenyan Vehicle Manufacturing – Thika, Kenya
 Suzuki Motor Corporation – Kosai, Shizuoka, Japan
 Suzuki Motor Corporation – Iwata, Shizuoka, Japan
 Toyota Motor Manufacturing France – Onnaing, France
 Toyota Auto Body – Inabe, Mie Prefecture, Japan
 [Alabama Mazda/Toyota plant]

Defunct
 Asia Automobile Industries (AAI) – Petaling Jaya, Selangor, Malaysia
 Associated Motors Industries (Malaysia) – Batu Tiga, Selangor, Malaysia Ceased operations in 2008.
 Changan Ford Mazda – Chongqing, China 
 Columbian Autocar Corporation – Parañaque, Philippines 
 Ford Edison Assembly Plant – Edison, New Jersey, USA (closed in 2004)
 Ford Kansas City Assembly Plant – Kansas City, Missouri, USA 
 Ford Louisville Assembly Plant – Louisville, Kentucky, USA
 Ford Twin Cities Assembly Plant – St. Paul, Minnesota, USA (closed in 2011)
 Ford Dagenham – Dagenham, England, U.K. 
 Ford Lio Ho Motor – Zhongli District, Taoyuan City, Taiwan 
 Ford Motor Company Philippines – Santa Rosa, Laguna, Philippines Closed in 2012
 Ford Valencia Assembly – Valencia, Carabobo, Venezuela 
 Ford Valencia Body and Assembly – Almussafes, Valencian Community, Spain 
 MARESA – Quito, Ecuador Ceased operations in 2015. 
 Motor Holdings – Otahuhu, New Zealand 
 PT National Assemblers – Jakarta, Indonesia 
 Nissan Motor – Oppama plant, Yokosuka, Kanagawa, Japan 
 Nissan Shatai – Shonan plant, Hiratsuka, Kanagawa, Japan 
 Nissan Shatai – Kyoto, Kyoto Prefecture, Japan 
 Sigma Motor Corporation & Samcor & Ford Motor Company of Southern Africa – Silverton, Pretoria, South Africa Mazda production ended in 2015-2016 fiscal year. 
 Steel Motor Assemblies Ltd. – Christchurch, New Zealand 
 Suzuki Indomobil Motor – Tambun & Cikarang plants, Bekasi Regency, Indonesia
 Swaraj Mazda – Punjab, India. Closed in 2011
 Willowvale Mazda Motor Industries (WMMI) – Harare, Zimbabwe -mothballed since 2012 when operations became unprofitable due to the local political conditions
 Vehicles Assemblers of New Zealand (VANZ) – Wiri, New Zealand 
 Vietnam Motors – Hanoi, Vietnam. Not currently producing cars, makes truck and buses.
 Bahman Group – Tehran, Iran Production seems to have ended by 2018

Notes

References

 
Mazda